Kyle Masson (born August 4, 1997, in Windermere, Florida) is an American racing driver.

Racing record

Career summary

Motorsports career results

WeatherTech SportsCar Championship results
(key)(Races in bold indicate pole position. Races in italics indicate fastest race lap in class. Results are overall/class)

References

External links
  
 Kyle Masson

1997 births
Living people
Racing drivers from Florida
WeatherTech SportsCar Championship drivers